Io e lui (He and I) is a 1973 Italian comedy film directed by Luciano Salce.

It is based on the novel with the same name by Alberto Moravia.

Cast 

 Lando Buzzanca: Rico 
 Bulle Ogier: Irene 
 Vittorio Caprioli: Cutica 
 Antonia Santilli: Flavia Protti 
 Gabriella Giorgelli: Fausta, the wife of Rico 
 Yves Beneyton: Maurizio 
 Mario Pisu: Protti  
 Paolo Bonacelli: Vladimiro 
 Nicoletta Elmi: Virginia

References

External links

1973 films
Italian comedy films
1973 comedy films
Films based on works by Alberto Moravia
Films directed by Luciano Salce
Films scored by Bruno Zambrini
1970s Italian films